At 07:26 BST on 19 September 2021, police officers were called to a residential property on Chandos Crescent in Killamarsh, Derbyshire, an outer suburb of Sheffield, South Yorkshire. Three children and one adult were found dead inside the property, with the incident being treated as a suspected mass murder. On 22 September 2021, 31-year-old Damien Bendall of Killamarsh was charged with four counts of murder and later rape of a girl under 13 in connection with the incident. 

He admitted all charges and was sentenced by Mr Justice Sweeney to a whole-life prison term on 21 December 2022.

Crime details 
Killamarsh is a former coal mining town situated in far northern Derbyshire. It is located close to the border with South Yorkshire, across which lies the city of Sheffield, of which Killamarsh has become an outer commuter suburb as Sheffield has expanded to the south and east. 

Police officers from the Derbyshire Constabulary attended to reports of a disturbance at a residential property on Chandos Crescent, close to Killamarsh town centre, at 07:26 local time on 19 September 2021. Arriving at the property, officers found Bendall outside, with self-inflicted stab wounds on his chest and stomach from a bread knife. Bendall told the officers he knew he would 'be going to prison again', and when asked what he had done, calmly responded with 'I've murdered four people.'  The officers then entered the property where they located the remains of three children and one adult inside. The victims were later named as siblings Lacey Bennett (aged 11) and John Paul Bennett (aged 13), their mother Terri Harris (aged 35), and Lacey's friend Connie Gent (aged 11); the two siblings and the mother lived together at the property, while Gent was staying at the property for a sleepover.

See also 
 Shiregreen child murders (2019)
 Derby arson attack (2012)
 Sheffield incest case (2008)
 Ughill Hall shootings (1986)
 List of prisoners with whole life orders

References 

2021 crimes in the United Kingdom
2021 in England
2020s in Derbyshire
Crime in Derbyshire
September 2021 crimes in Europe
September 2021 events in the United Kingdom
North East Derbyshire District